The Nordic Bible Museum (Nobimu), located in Oslo, Norway, is the first Bible museum in the Nordic countries.

History and organization
Until 2016, when it was purchased by Arnhoff, the collection had previously belonged to the Norwegian Bible Society. Arnhoff has stated that while he is a Jehovah's Witness, the museum is his own personal project and not associated with the organization. At the time of opening, there were approximately 2,500 Bibles in the collection; many more have since been donated by the public.

The Nordic Bible Museum was inaugurated on 31 May 2018 by Member of Parliament Kristin Ørmen Johnsen. It is located at Nedre Slottsgate 4C in Oslo's city center.

It is organized as a foundation run by about 40 volunteers.

Exhibitions
The museum has the Nordic countries' largest collection of over 5,000 Bibles  and contains a varied selection of Nordic and non-Nordic Bibles.

There are also themed exhibitions on the King James Version – the most printed Bible – and a collection of miniature Bibles, the world's smallest printed Bible among them.

During the COVID-19 pandemic, the museum focused on digital exhibitions: parts of the collection were digitized, allowing visitors to view them remotely, and the museum held webinars on the history of the Bible.

References

External links

Museums established in 2018
2018 establishments in Norway
Museums in Oslo
Bible-themed museums, zoos, and botanical gardens
History museums in Norway